Sir David Wemyss of Wemyss (d. 1332) was a 13th-14th century Scottish noble.

David was the son of Michael Wemyss of Wemyss.

He performed fealty to King Edward I of England at Berwick upon Tweed in 1298, was a supporter of King Robert I of Scotland and signed the Declaration of Arbroath in 1320. David died in 1332.

Family and issue
David married Marjory Ramsay, daughter of Walter Ramsey. He is known to have had the following known issue, to a number of wives:
Micheal of Wemyss
James of Bogie

Citations

References
Burke, Bernard. "A Genealogical History of the Dormant, Abeyant, Forfeited, and Extinct Peerages of the British Empire", Harrison (1866).

Year of birth unknown
1332 deaths
Medieval Scottish knights
13th-century Scottish people
14th-century Scottish people
Signatories to the Declaration of Arbroath
David